Mubarak Hassan Shami (born Richard Yatich on December 1, 1980) is a Kenyan-born Qatari long-distance runner. He specializes in half marathon and marathon races.

Biography
Shami won the Baringo Half Marathon, a race inaugurated by Paul Tergat, in 2005 and 2006, becoming the first runner to defend the title.

In October 2005 he won a silver medal at the 2005 World Half Marathon Championships. He won the Paris Marathon on April 15, 2007.

Shami won the silver medal at the 2007 World Championships. His last victory in a marathon was in Otsu (2008) with the time of 2:08:23. He is coached by Renato Canova.

Achievements

References

External links

1980 births
Living people
Qatari male long-distance runners
Qatari male marathon runners
Kenyan male long-distance runners
Kenyan male marathon runners
Athletes (track and field) at the 2008 Summer Olympics
Olympic athletes of Qatar
Paris Marathon male winners
Asian Games medalists in athletics (track and field)
Kenyan emigrants to Qatar
Naturalised citizens of Qatar
World Athletics Championships medalists
Athletes (track and field) at the 2006 Asian Games
Athletes (track and field) at the 2010 Asian Games
Qatari people of Kenyan descent
Asian Games gold medalists for Qatar
Asian Games bronze medalists for Qatar
Medalists at the 2006 Asian Games
Medalists at the 2010 Asian Games